Tilted Axis Press is a non-profit British publishing house specializing in the publication of contemporary Asian literature. Founded by Deborah Smith in 2015 following the success of her translation of Han Kang's The Vegetarian, the organization has gone on to publish 26 books and several chapbooks. Tilted Axis became known as the original translator and English language publisher of Tokyo Ueno Station by Miri Yu, which went on to receive critical acclaim as both a book and translation. Their profile rose higher in 2022, when Tomb of Sand, written by Geetanjali Shree and translated by Daisy Rockwell, won the International Booker Prize, marking the first novel written in Hindi to take the award.

History 
As of 2017, Tilted Axis Press made the largest share of their sales through traditional brick-and-mortar retail (35.1%), with the second largest channel being direct local and international sales through their website. Although the press has only received limited distribution outside of the United Kingdom, some books have been co-published internationally. For example, in 2018 The Lifted Brow, under their Brow Books imprint, co-published their translation of "The Impossible Fairytale" in Australia.

One of the collections in the series, Pa-Liwanag, received a positive review from CNN Philippines, who stated the book "proves that writings by farmers and peasants are overdue".

In July 2022, following Tilted Axis's victory at The Booker International Prize, Deborah Smith announced that she was stepping down as Publisher and Managing Director. At the same time, Kristen Vida Alfaro was announced as her successor in these roles.

Titles

References 

British companies established in 2015
Publishing companies established in 2015
Book publishing companies of the United Kingdom